Karen Nicolson ( MacLeod; 4 April 1958 – 8 June 2021) was a British long-distance runner. She represented Great Britain running the marathon at the 1996 Summer Olympics and 1993 World Championships in Athletics. She also represented her native Scotland in the 1994 Commonwealth Games marathon.

Marathons
Karen MacLeod grew up on Skye. After leaving Skye she came late into athletics, at the age of 24 running in the Bath Half Marathon to raise funds for cancer research, from which her father had died. Though within a short time she took
part in the world cross-country championships in 1985, 1986 and 1987. In 1987 she won the Scottish National cross-country Championship.

MacLeod ran the 10,000m at the 1990 Commonwealth Games finishing 12th in a race won by compatriot Liz McColgan. She then switched to the longer distance of marathon and enjoyed success in the early 1990s by winning the Bordeaux Marathon, Majorca Marathon and Seville Marathon. In the 1991 Carpi Marathon she finished 12th behind British athletes Andrea Wallace and Marian Sutton, and in the 1992 London Marathon she finished 22nd again behind Wallace and Sutton but also Julia Gates. These performances earned her a place at the 1993 World Championships in Athletics in which she finished 16th and only two minutes behind first Briton Marian Sutton.

In 1994 MacLeod represented Scotland in the Commonwealth Games marathon in Victoria, running a personal best of 2:33:16 finishing fourth and less than a minute behind Yvonne Danson. She was selected for the 1996 Summer Olympics in Atlanta, with Liz McColgan and Suzanne Rigg, finishing 45th in a time of 2:42:08, despite at 38 years being one of the oldest in the field.

MacLeod became an athletics coach, coaching the Skye runner Hugh Campbell.

Health and death
In 2008, MacLeod revealed that she was suffering from Berger's disease, an acute kidney problem, and had to undergo emergency dialysis, eventually she had to receive a kidney transplant from her sister Deborah.

She died on 8 June 2021, at the age of 63.

Competition record

References

External links

Karen MacLeod profile at Sport-Reference

1958 births
2021 deaths
British female long-distance runners
British female marathon runners
Athletes (track and field) at the 1996 Summer Olympics
Olympic athletes of Great Britain
Athletes (track and field) at the 1990 Commonwealth Games
Athletes (track and field) at the 1994 Commonwealth Games
Commonwealth Games competitors for Scotland
Scottish female marathon runners
People from the Isle of Skye